Akhmed Khuchbarov (1904; Gul, Terek Oblast, Russian Empire – 1956; Tbilisi, Georgian SSR, Soviet Union) was an Ingush abrek who was known for making operations and attacks on NKVD and KGB members, avenging the deported Ingushes. He is considered an Ingush national hero.

Life
Akhmed Khuchbarov was born in Gul in 1904. He is a representative of the taip Guloy. Akhmed was educated. While living in Angusht in 1924 he was affected by Dekulakization. Later went on the path of abrechestvo.

Akhmed Khuchbarov waged war on the NKVD. Khuchbarov Akhmed, with his associates and the bandits most devoted to him, specifically tracked down the employees of the NKVD who participated in the fight against banditry, and took measures to kill them. Operations of the NKVD were carried out by special decision of the government, and they involved 19 thousand operational workers of the People's Commissariat of Internal Affairs and up to 100 thousand officers and soldiers of the NKVD troops. By special order of L. Beria 63 to eliminate banditry in the evicted regions of Ingushetia and Chechnya, the NKVD troops created military garrisons, reconnaissance and operational groups were formed.

From 1944 to 1953, Akhmed Khuchbarov’s fighters carried out about 30 operations against the troops of the NKVD and the NKGB. Personally, Akhmed Khuchbarov has killed at least 100 special service operatives over the years. For two years, from 1953 to 1955, under the leadership of the KGB of the USSR, the Ministry of Internal Affairs of Georgia developed a special operation "to eliminate the socially dangerous criminal and political gang of Akhmed Khuchbarov". The special plan set specific tasks for the KGB and the Ministry of Internal Affairs of Georgia: collection and processing of available and incoming information about Akhmed Khuchbarov and his detachment; recruitment in the Akhmeta, Dusheti districts and the former Checheno-Ingush ASSR of agents for the corresponding work on the introduction of Khuchbarov into the detachment.

Operations against NKVD

Capture and Death
In September of 1954, in Tbilisi, under the leadership of the Minister of Internal Affairs of the Georgian SSR, A.N. Inauri (who became the chairman of the KGB under the Council of Ministers of the Georgian SSR after this operation) The plan for the liquidation of Khuchbarov's detachment was approved. The group of "liquidators" included V. I. Shaduri - head of the department of the KGB of Georgia, A. Kvasheli - deputy minister of internal affairs, G. Guchmazashvili - head of the criminal investigation department of the Police department of the Ministry of Internal Affairs of the Georgian SSR. In 1953 Abu-Bakr Khuchbarov was brought from a Kazakh prison. He negotiated with Akhmed for a whole year and was properly processed by the organs beforehand. In January of 1955, Akhmed Khuchbarov trusting, met with V. I. Shaduri for negotiations, where he was fraudulently captured.

The investigation went on for a year. More than 30 Ingush were brought from Kazakhstan to the trial, which took place in Tbilisi in 1956. Akhmed Khuchbarov was convicted of sabotage by military tribunal of the Transcaucasian Military District and shot.

References

History of the Caucasus
History of Ingushetia
Ingush people